The Ha! Ha! Pyramid is a contemporary art monument commemorating the Saguenay flood of 1996. Located in the district of La Baie in Saguenay, Quebec, the pyramid was named after the nearby Ha! Ha! River. Conceived as a form of therapy to help residents recover from the traumatic events of the flood, it is covered in 3,000 yield signs, based on the similarity of pronunciation of the French words for "to yield" (céder ) and "to help each other" (s'aider ).

History

The neighbourhood of Grande-Baie suffered heavy damage from the flood of 1996. Ten people died and between 12,000 to 16,000 residents were displaced.

The project was therefore seen as a form of therapy to help residents recover from the traumatic events of the flood, and to revitalise the area by adding a new tourist and artistic attraction. A group of local citizens formed The Restoration Committee of Ha! Ha!, put forward the idea for a new art installation, and requested help from local artist Jean-Jules Soucy. Soucy submitted a contemporary design that would express both "originality and a sense of humor". 

The project called for the full restoration of the Ha! Ha!

The project was estimated to cost $2 million, and was completed in several stages.  The Ha! Ha! park was completed in 1998 for a total of $1.3 million, and was officially inaugurated during the 2000 Festival of Lac-Saint-Jean.  Financing was achieved through a public-private partnership, including a fund-raising campaign that netted $300,000. Finally, in 2005, a public square was completed next to the project at a cost of $35,000.

Description
The design of the signs were noted by Soucy to be similar to the Greek delta (Δ). The signs are meant to encourage people to help one another, as the French word for "yield", céder, is pronounced the same as s'aider, meaning "to help each other".

A central staircase provides access to an observation deck which allows views of the Haha portion of the surrounding Saguenay River valley. On the pyramid's interior walls there are a number of plaques dedicated to local families engraved with the names of those who were directly affected by the flood.

Recognition
In 2007 the pyramid was one of three finalists for the "new development prize" from Les Arts et la Ville, a nonprofit organisation that supports the artistic and cultural life of smaller municipalities.

References

Pyramids in Canada
Buildings and structures in Saguenay, Quebec
Buildings and structures completed in 1998
1998 establishments in Quebec